The Lotus was a popular English pop/rock band in Hong Kong in the 1960s. The most notable member was Samuel Hui.

Career
The band along with Roman and the Four Steps was noteworthy for singing in English and often singing British and American songs.

Instruments
 Samuel Hui – lead vocal
 Danny So (蘇雄) – bass guitar
 David Cheung (張浚英) – drums
 Albert Li (李松江) – rhythm guitar
 Wallace Chow (周華年) – lead guitar

References

Hong Kong musical groups
Chinese musical groups
English-language singers from Hong Kong